is a city located in Hiroshima Prefecture, Japan. As of July 31. 2016 the city has an estimated population of 185,418 and a population density of 291.85 persons per km2. The total area is 635.32 km2.

Higashihiroshima is a university town of Hiroshima University. Higashihiroshima is adjacent to Hiroshima, and serves as a commuter town for the city. The literal translation of the city's name is "Eastern Hiroshima."

An annual sake matsuri is held every October.

The city was founded on April 20, 1974, from the merger of the four towns of Saijō, Hachihonmatsu, Shiwa and Takaya in Kamo District.

In 1992, the population reached 100,000.

On February 7, 2005, the towns of Kurose, Kōchi, Toyosaka and Fukutomi (all from Kamo District), and the town of Akitsu (from Toyota District) were merged into Higashihiroshima.

Geography

Climate
Higashihiroshima has a humid subtropical climate (Köppen climate classification Cfa) characterized by cool to mild winters and hot, humid summers.

Demographics
Per Japanese census data, the population of Higashihiroshima in 2020 is 196,608 people. Higashihiroshima has been conducting censuses since 1960.

Notable people from Higashihiroshima
 Reizo Fukuhara, Japanese soccer player (Midfielder)
 Ryuji Sainei, Japanese actor
 Koichi Isobe, former Nippon Professional Baseball outfielder
 Yūki Himura, Japanese comedian, Japanese actor and voice actor
 Yasuyuki Yamauchi, Japanese professional baseball player and baseball coach
 Daiki Nishiyama, Japanese judoka
 Akinoshima Katsumi, former sumo wrestler (Real Name: Katsumi Yamanaka, Nihongo: 山中勝美, Yamanaka Katsumi)
 Ryuichi Hirashige, Japanese former footballer (Striker)
 Ayako Okamoto, Japanese professional golfer and member of the World Golf Hall of Fame
 Akira Ibayashi, Japanese soccer player (Sanfrecce Hiroshima, J1 League)

References

External links
 Higashihiroshima City official website 
 Higashihiroshima City official website 

Cities in Hiroshima Prefecture
Planned cities in Japan